The Nepali Wikipedia is the Nepali language edition of Wikipedia, run by the Wikimedia Foundation. As of 8 November 2022, the Nepali Wikipedia is the 110st largest Wikipedia.

Nepali, using the Devanagari script, requires complex transliteration aids to be typed on devices. Thus, It has a phonetic Latin alphabet converter to Nepali, without having to use any special Nepali-typing software.

History 
The Nepali Wikipedia was established on 3 June 2002, one year after the English Wikipedia was started, and it was among the first language of South Asia to have its own Wikipedia.

Statistics
The overwhelming majority of its readers originate from Nepal.

Users and editors

See also 

 Tamil Wikipedia
 Bhojpuri Wikipedia
 Maithili Wikipedia
 Hindi Wikipedia
 Sanskrit Wikipedia
 Bengali Wikipedia

References

External links

 Nepali Wikipedia
 Wikipedia.org multilingual portal
 Wikimedia Foundation

Wikipedias by language
Nepali-language websites
Wikipedia in India
2002 establishments in Nepal
Nepali-language encyclopedias
Internet properties established in 2002
Asian encyclopedias